Atlantic High School (commonly known as AHS) is a rural public high school in Atlantic, Iowa, United States, and serves students in grades nine through twelve. It is a part of the Atlantic Community School District, which serves Atlantic and Marne. The AHS mascot is the Trojans and their colors are black and gold.

The old high school building, now used as the middle school, was built in 1937 as part of the Public Works Administration during the Great Depression and was listed on the National Register of Historic Places in 2002.

The school's sole notable alum is Todd A. Hensley, a district associate judge for Iowa's Third Judicial District.

Athletics
The Trojans compete in the Hawkeye 10 Conference in the following sports:

Fall Sports
Cross Country (boys and girls)
Football
Volleyball
Swimming (girls)

Winter Sports
Basketball (boys and girls)
Bowling
Wrestling (boys and girls)
Swimming (boys)

Spring Sports
Golf (boys and girls)
Soccer (boys and girls)
Tennis (boys and girls)
Track and Field (boys and girls)

Summer Sports
Baseball
Softball

See also
List of high schools in Iowa

References

External links
School website

School buildings completed in 1937
Atlantic, Iowa
Public high schools in Iowa
School buildings on the National Register of Historic Places in Iowa
National Register of Historic Places in Cass County, Iowa
Moderne architecture in Iowa
Public Works Administration in Iowa
Schools in Cass County, Iowa
1937 establishments in Iowa